The discography of Filter, an American rock band, consists of seven studio albums, one compilation album, one remix album, two video albums, two extended plays, 20 singles and 11 music videos.

Albums

Studio albums

Compilation albums

Remix albums

Video albums

Extended plays

Singles

Promotional singles

Soundtrack appearances

Music videos

References

External links
 
 
 

Discographies of American artists
Rock music group discographies